Hemas Hospitals is a Sri Lankan chain of hospitals based in Wattala. It expanded its developments in Thalawathugoda area in 2013 making it one of the largest ever known tertiary hospital chains in Sri Lanka. Hemas Hospitals also operates the largest medical diagnostic laboratory chain in Sri Lanka.

Hemas Hospitals Wattala, and Thalawathugoda

This is the first-ever known tertiary care private hospital established in the Gampaha District. Within the past few years, the hospital has come along with a breach of development that features 24/7 emergency access for patients and an online consultation system. There are approximately 130 beds at the hospital including intensive care units and an emergency treatment unit. The facilities of Hemas Hospital Wattala also includes laboratory, MRI Scans, CT Scans, Ultrasound Scans, Digital X-Ray, Mammography, Dexa Scans, Endoscopy, Laparoscopic surgery, cystoscopy, Fertility center, Cosmetic center, health checks, general surgery, orthopedic surgery, gastrointestinal surgery, kidney transplant, weight loss surgery, gynecology, obstetrics, neurosurgery, pediatrics, and internal medicine.

References 

 Hospital buildings completed in 2002
 Hospitals in Gampaha District
 Hospitals established in 2002
 Health care companies of Sri Lanka
 Private hospitals in Sri Lanka
2002 establishments in Sri Lanka